The Internazionali di Tennis Città di Rovereto is a professional tennis tournament played on indoor hard courts. It is currently part of the Association of Tennis Professionals (ATP) Challenger Tour. It has been held in Rovereto, Italy since 2023.

Past finals

Singles

Doubles

References

ATP Challenger Tour
Hard court tennis tournaments
Tennis tournaments in Italy
Recurring sporting events established in 2023